David Osterberg (born April 19, 1943) is an American politician who served in the Iowa House of Representatives from 1983 to 1995. He was the unsuccessful Democratic nominee for the United States Senate in 1998.

References

1943 births
Living people
Democratic Party members of the Iowa House of Representatives